Duke Video is a video publisher and television programme distributor specialising in motorsports.

Duke Video was founded in the Isle of Man in 1981 by Peter Duke, son of six-time motorcycle World Champion Geoff Duke. Originally a mail-order only service, the company grew in the 1990s and obtained a retail presence in HMV, Virgin Megastores and Halfords.

Today, Duke are the world's largest distributor of motorsport-oriented home entertainment products, having over 3,000 titles published on all popular platforms  to over 150,000 direct customers and licensees in several territories. The company also founded and operates the iomtt.com website which has been the leading website of the Isle of Man TT races since 2000.

References

Privately held companies
Companies of the Isle of Man
Douglas, Isle of Man
Publishing companies established in 1981